autonomy is the capacity to make an informed, uncoerced decision.

Autonomism is a set of left-wing, socialist movements that first appeared in Italy in the 1970s.

Autonomism may also refer to:
Jewish Autonomism, non-Zionist belief in the need to develop Jewish cultural identity within the Diaspora
Autonomism (political doctrine), Regionalist, separatist or secessionist movement in favour of regional autonomy within a nation or independence
Quebec autonomism, a form of nationalism in Quebec which advocates delegation of many higher political/federal-level powers to the province, while remaining within Canada
Italian autonomism espoused by the Autonomist Association and the Autonomist Party in the eastern Adriatic

See also
Autonomy